The 1965 Philippine presidential and vice presidential elections were held on November 9, 1965. Incumbent President Diosdado Macapagal lost his opportunity to get a second full term as president of the Philippines to Senate President Ferdinand Marcos. His running mate, Senator Gerardo Roxas, lost to former vice president Fernando Lopez. Emmanuel Pelaez, who resigned in the Cabinet and from the Liberal Party, then sought the Nacionalista Party presidential nomination and lost it to Marcos, did not run for vice president and instead ran in the House of Representatives as an independent. An unprecedented twelve candidates ran for president; however, nine of those won 200 votes or less.

This was the first election where all of the major presidential candidates were born after the end of the Spanish colonization of the Philippines.

Results

President

Vice-President

See also
Commission on Elections
Politics of the Philippines
Philippine elections
President of the Philippines
6th Congress of the Philippines

External links
 The Philippine Presidency Project
 Official website of the Commission on Elections
 Diosdado Macapagal on the Presidential Museum and Library
 Ferdinand Marcos on the Presidential Museum and Library

1965
1965 elections in the Philippines